Krystyna Ankwicz (4 April 1907 – 6 August 1985) was a Polish film actress.

Selected filmography
 Kult ciała (1930)
 Uwiedziona (1931)
 Sto metrów miłości (1932)
 Bohaterowie Sybiru (1936)

References

External links

1907 births
1985 deaths
Actors from Lviv
People from the Kingdom of Galicia and Lodomeria
Polish Austro-Hungarians
Polish film actresses
Polish stage actresses
20th-century Polish actresses